The Vice of Fools is a 1920 American silent drama film directed by Edward H. Griffith and starring Alice Joyce, Ellen Burford, and Robert Gordon.

Cast
 Alice Joyce as Marion Rogers
 Ellen Burford as Diana Spaulding 
 Robert Gordon as Cameron West
 Raymond Bloomer as Granville Wingate
 William H. Tooker as Stewart Rogers 
 Elizabeth Garrison as Mrs. Rogers
 Agnes Everett as Mrs. Spaulding

References

Bibliography
 Donald W. McCaffrey & Christopher P. Jacobs. Guide to the Silent Years of American Cinema. Greenwood Publishing, 1999.

External links
 

1920 films
1920 drama films
1920s English-language films
American silent feature films
Silent American drama films
American black-and-white films
Films directed by Edward H. Griffith
Vitagraph Studios films
1920s American films